Aliyu Musa (born December 1, 1957) is a member of the House of Representatives of Nigeria. A member of the People's Democratic Party, he was elected in 1999 and represents the Mani/Bindawa constituency in Katsina State.

Musa graduated from Ahmadu Bello University with a Bachelor of Science degree in Political Science & History. He is married with two children.

References

People from Katsina State
1957 births
Living people
Peoples Democratic Party members of the House of Representatives (Nigeria)
Members of the House of Representatives (Nigeria)